MIY may refer to:

 Mersin İdman Yurdu or Mersin İdmanyurdu SK, a Turkish sports club
 Мы or We, a dystopian novel by Yevgeny Zamyatin completed in 1921
 The ISO 639-3 code of Ayutla Mixtec language
 MuniYield Michigan Insured Fund, Inc., a company listed on the New York Stock Exchange